Below is a list of various national anthems which, at some point in time, were the de jure or de facto anthems of various contemporary or historical states.

List

See also
Historical Chinese anthems
List of national anthems
List of anthems of non-sovereign countries, regions and territories

Notes

Translations and transliterations

References
General
 
 
 
 
 
 
Specific

External links
National anthems of the world, performed by the United States Navy Band

National anthems (historical)
 
Historical